Salzböde is a river of Hesse, Germany. It is a right tributary of the river Lahn, which it joins near Lollar.

See also
List of rivers of Hesse

References

Rivers of Hesse
Rivers of Germany